The 1926 Ohio gubernatorial election was held on November 2, 1926. Incumbent Democrat A. Victor Donahey defeated Republican nominee Myers Y. Cooper with 50.33% of the vote.

General election

Candidates
Major party candidates
A. Victor Donahey, Democratic
Myers Y. Cooper, Republican 

Other candidates
Joseph Sharts, Socialist
Walter Freeman, Socialist Labor

Results

References

1926
Ohio
Gubernatorial